The 1978 Can-Am season was the eleventh running of the Sports Car Club of America's prototype based series and the second running of the revived series. Alan Jones was declared champion, winning five of the ten rounds. Chevrolet again swept the season. Lola was not as dominant this season, as Elliot Forbes-Robinson won at Charlotte in a Spyder, SCCA legend George Follmer at Mont Tremblant in a Prophet, and Forbes-Robinson again at Trois-Rivieres.

Results

References

Can-Am seasons
1978 in motorsport
1978 in American motorsport
1978 in Canadian motorsport